Rutavand (also Romanized as Rūtavand, Rootvand, Rūtvand; also known as Rūtāvand Harsam and Saiyidha Dawetahwand) is a village in Mansuri Rural District, Homeyl District, Eslamabad-e Gharb County, Kermanshah Province, Iran. At the 2006 census, its population was 150, in 28 families.

References 

Populated places in Eslamabad-e Gharb County